Mona Siddiqui  (born 3 May 1963) is a British academic. She is Professor of Islamic and Interreligious Studies at the University of Edinburgh, a member of the Commission on Scottish Devolution and a member of the Nuffield Council on Bioethics. She is also a regular contributor to Thought for the Day, Sunday and The Moral Maze on BBC Radio 4, and to The Times, The Scotsman, The Guardian, Sunday Herald.

Early life
Siddiqui was born in Karachi, Pakistan. The family moved from Pakistan to England in 1968. Her father was a psychiatrist and moved to England to carry out post-graduate work in Cambridge. His work eventually took the family to Huddersfield when he gained a substantive job. They lived in four successive houses in Huddersfield, moving partly because the family expanded from four to six, and finally into a 1930s detached house in a relatively prosperous area near the town centre. The household was very literary and there were many books in the house. Urdu was generally spoken at home, and so the children became bilingual. Her father also spoke Arabic and worked in Saudi Arabia for a few years, where he was visited by Siddiqui at the age of about 18 together with her sister.

At the age of 11, Siddique attended Salendine Nook High School, a multicultural school, where she excelled in English. She later moved to Greenhead College.

Siddiqui is fluent in French, Arabic and Urdu and is married with three sons.

Career
Siddiqui took her Bachelor of Arts in Arabic and French at the University of Leeds (graduating in 1984), and her Master of Arts in Middle-Eastern Studies and PhD in Classical Islamic Law at the University of Manchester (graduating in 1986 and 1992 respectively).  She served as a member of the Advisory Boards for Glasgow's Gallery of Modern Art, Scottish Asian Arts, IB Tauris Religious Studies project and the Journal of the American Academy of Religion.

She has worked at the University of Glasgow since 1996, and in 1998 founded the Centre for the Study of Islam. In 2006, she was appointed Professor of Islamic Studies and Public Understanding, and served as a Senate Assessor on the University Court.

In 2011 Siddiqui became the first person to hold a chair in Islamic and Interreligious Studies at the University of Edinburgh's School of Divinity. She was subsequently appointed  Dean International for the Middle East.

Her areas of specialisation are classical Islamic law, law and gender, early Islamic thought, and contemporary legal and ethical issues in Islam.  Professor Siddiqui is the author of 'How to Read the Qur'an' (Granta), a four-volume edited collection 'Islam' (Sage) and 'The Good Muslim' (CUP).  She is currently working on two further monographs with Yale University Press and IB Tauris. She has published articles and chapters on classical Islamic Law and also writes and speaks frequently on Christian-Muslim issues.

Siddiqui is patron of The Feast, a pioneering youthwork charity which works for community cohesion between Christian and Muslim young people.

Recognition

Siddiqui was elected a Fellow of the Royal Society of Edinburgh in March 2005 and of the Royal Society of Arts in October 2005. She also holds honorary D.Litt.s from the University of Wolverhampton and the University of Leicester. In addition. she was awarded an honorary Doctor of Civil Laws by the University of Huddersfield.

Siddiqui was appointed Officer of the Order of the British Empire (OBE) in the 2011 Birthday Honours for services to inter-faith relations.

In January 2013, Siddiqui was nominated for the Services to Education award at the British Muslim Awards.

She was elected to American Academy of Arts and Sciences - International Honorary Member (2019).

Bibliography
Books

References

External links 
Two-part interview conducted by Henk de Berg (2018).

 part I: on Siddiqui's biography, Muslim identity, the hijab
 part II: on the Quran, Mohammed, Hadith, Sunni and Shia

1963 births
Living people
Academics of the University of Edinburgh
Alumni of the University of Leeds
Alumni of the University of Manchester
Royal Society of Arts
Fellows of the Royal Society of Edinburgh
Pakistani emigrants to the United Kingdom
Naturalised citizens of the United Kingdom
Officers of the Order of the British Empire
Christian and Islamic interfaith dialogue
British academics of Pakistani descent
Women scholars of Islam